Kathleen Coleman (born in Weymouth, Massachusetts) is an American former child actor, singer, and author, known for playing Holly Marshall on the 1970s children's TV show Land of the Lost.

Life and career 
Kathy Coleman toured as a singer with the Mike Curb Congregation.

In 1974, she was cast by Sid and Marty Kroft to play Holly Marshall, the younger of two siblings trapped with their father in a strange land in Land of the Lost. It was her only major television role, which continued for three seasons. She contributed interviews and commentary tracks for the Land of the Lost DVDs produced by Rhino in 2004. She and fellow Land of the Lost cast member Wesley Eure filmed cameos for the 2009 film parodying the series, but those scenes were not included in the theatrical release.

She appeared in an episode of the police drama Adam-12 in 1975.

In 2015, Coleman published Lost Girl: The Truth and Nothing But the Truth, So Help Me Kathleen, which describes two abusive marriages as well as her experiences in music, TV, and on the autograph circuit. In 2017, she published a second memoir, entitled Run Holly Run, which highlighted her time working on Land of the Lost.

Personal life 
Kathleen Coleman was born on February 18, 1962. Her claim to fame is for her portrayal of "Holly Marshall" on "Land of the Lost" (1974), a show which first ran on Saturday mornings on NBC from September 1974 to December 1976. Her straight bangs and braids, along with her red and white checked shirt and corduroys became her trademark. Holly was the first love for many who grew up watching the show. She married at age 18 and had two sons. She worked on her father-in-law's dairy farm in Fallon, Nevada with her husband for several years before they divorced around 1987. After the divorce, she moved back to the Los Angeles area.

References

External links 
 

American film actresses
American television actresses
People from Weymouth, Massachusetts
Living people
American child actresses
Actresses from Massachusetts
20th-century American actresses
21st-century American women
1962 births